The Horatio Alger Association of Distinguished Americans is a nonprofit organization based in Alexandria, Virginia, that was founded in 1947 to honor the achievements of outstanding Americans who have succeeded in spite of adversity and to emphasize the importance of higher education. The association is named for Horatio Alger, a 19th-century author of hundreds of dime novels in the "rags-to-riches" genre, extolling the importance of perseverance and hard work.

The association gives the annual Horatio Alger Award to exemplars of its ideals. It also grants scholarships, and describes itself as the largest provider of need-based scholarships in the United States. All scholarships are funded by the generosity of the members of the Horatio Alger Association.

Scholarship programs 

The Horatio Alger Association has one of the largest, privately funded, need-based college scholarship programs in the United States. Scholarships offered include the National Scholarship, State Scholarships and the Dennis R. Washington Achievement Scholarship.

National Scholars

The National Scholars Program was created in 1984 to help American high school seniors who had overcome adversity to attend college. Over time the Horatio Alger Association has expanded the program. Every year, the association awards more than 100 National scholarships to students from every U.S. state and Puerto Rico. Grants received by these National Scholars are valued at $25,000 each. Recipients are also given an all-expenses-paid trip to Washington, D.C. where they meet association members, attend the Horatio Alger Awards Ceremony, and learn about the federal government and the American free enterprise system. Since its inception in 1984, the program has awarded more than $125 million in college scholarships.

In 2010, the association gave $20,000 scholarships to 104 high school seniors.

State Scholarships

The association also operates a State Scholars program that gives scholarships to students in every state.  Award amounts range from $2,500 and $10,500.

Dennis R. Washington Achievement Scholarship

Alumni recipients of the scholarship are eligible to receive the Dennis R. Washington Achievement Scholarship. The scholarship is awarded to alumni who are seeking graduate and doctoral degrees. The program is funded by a $10 million grant from Horatio Alger member Dennis R. Washington, and his wife, Phyllis.

Horatio Alger Award 

The association annually bestows the Horatio Alger Award on outstanding Americans who exemplify dedication, purpose, and perseverance in their personal and professional lives. Recipients have often achieved success in the face of adversity. Each award recipient becomes a lifetime member of the association.

The annual award series was inaugurated in 1947 by Kenneth Beebe of the American Schools and Colleges Association. In 1946 he had given achievement awards to two New York City businessmen. In 1947, he renamed the award for Horatio Alger and made four awards to businessmen. Recipients in subsequent years have included business and government leaders, athletes, entertainers, innovators, entrepreneurs, healers, teachers, artists, and writers who have overcome adversity and achieved great success. Currently, approximately ten American awardees are announced each year.  Additionally, each year since 2003 an International Horatio Alger Award has been presented to a citizen of another country who serves as a role model and embodies the ideals promoted by the association.

Notable awardees have included:

See also
Self-made man

References

External links 
 

Organizations established in 1947
Non-profit organizations based in Alexandria, Virginia
Scholarships in the United States
1947 establishments in Virginia